Frank Klawonn (born 22 March 1966 in Schwedt, Brandenburg) is a German rower, who competed for the SG Dynamo Potsdam / Sportvereinigung (SV) Dynamo. He won the medals at the international rowing competitions. In October 1986, he was awarded a Patriotic Order of Merit in gold (first class) for his sporting success.

References 

1966 births
Living people
Sportspeople from Schwedt
East German male rowers
Olympic medalists in rowing
World Rowing Championships medalists for East Germany
Medalists at the 1988 Summer Olympics
Olympic gold medalists for East Germany
Olympic rowers of East Germany
Rowers at the 1988 Summer Olympics
Recipients of the Patriotic Order of Merit in gold